Palana is a village in Bikaner District, Rajasthan, India.

History

In the 14th century, the brother of Rao Jodha, the founder of Jodhpur, and Rao Bika's Kakosa Rao Mandan ji, along with his trusted chieftains, left for the Jangal region to establish a new state and took control of 84 villages in the Jangal region. 14th in Jangal Pradesh by conquering many big and small places and tribesEstablished the Rathore dynasty in the 14th century in Jangal region. He founded Palana in the 14th century and made it his capital. And got a brass-floored pond constructed for fortification and water storage, before taking over from Rao Mandan ji, here was the shelter of Siyag Jato, who had been displaced from Pallu, which is presently (Hanumangarh), who came from Pallu. Palana got the name Palana due to the disorientation of the people, Palana is currently 21km from Bikaner. Bikaner is situated on the Nagaur main highway in the south-west, the descendants of Rao Mandan ji still live in Palana and in their bright lineage, two brave warriors were born to protect the cows and ryots of the village, without caring for their lives. By sacrificing everything, he immortalized his fame on this earth, whose memorial (Devlinya) is built in the village. Where even today we pray with reverence, and get the desired blessings., Veer Jujhar ji Near the temple there is a temple of Mahasati Dadi, who got jalsati to save her grandson, her grand temple has been built, where every month on the thirteenth day, Dadi's Teras is celebrated. It is also known for the ancestral place of the great Guru Shri Ramlal Ji Siyag. Who gave this world a unique form of yoga and meditation (Kundalini Shakti Siddha Yoga). The tomb/samadhi of Gurudev Siyag is also located here. Which is built on the road leading to Barsingsar, about 4 km from Palana village and has all the necessary facilities for the visiting devotees, thousands of people visit the holy land of Palana every day to seek knowledge and eternal peace. And fulfill your wishes, all the guests who come are warmly welcome in Palana.

Geography 

Demographics 
As of the 2011 Indian census, Palana had a population of 9,331. Males constitute 53% of the population and females 47%. Palana has an average literacy rate of 51%: male literacy is 66%, and female literacy is 34%.

References 

Cities and towns in Bikaner district